Gabrielle Tremblay (born July 27, 1990 in La Malbaie, Quebec) is a Canadian actress and writer, who received a Canadian Screen Award nomination as Best Supporting Actress at the 5th Canadian Screen Awards for her performance as Klas Batalo in the 2016 film Those Who Make Revolution Halfway Only Dig Their Own Graves (Ceux qui font les révolutions à moitié n'ont fait que se creuser un tombeau).

Those Who Make Revolution was her first feature film role, although she has previously appeared in short films and documentaries. Her poetry collection Le ventre des volcans was published by Les Éditions de l'étoile de mer in 2015.

She came out as transgender in 2012. She was the first transgender woman ever nominated for an acting award at the Canadian Screen Awards or their predecessor Genie Awards.

References

External links

21st-century Canadian poets
21st-century Canadian actresses
Canadian women poets
Canadian poets in French
Canadian film actresses
Canadian LGBT actors
Canadian LGBT poets
Transgender actresses
Canadian transgender writers
Writers from Quebec
Actresses from Quebec
Living people
1990 births
21st-century Canadian women writers
Transgender poets
21st-century Canadian LGBT people